Tagera Ningwaphumang is the main traditional cultural god of Limbu community. She is often identified as the "Supreme Body of Knowledge" or the "Creator of the World. They worship this god in various festivities such as Chasok Tangnam. It is in Limbu language which translates as invisible god of spirit.

References

https://web.archive.org/web/20090901000000*/http://chumlung.org.np/page.php?page=6

South Asian deities
Religion in Nepal